Taurus Armas S.A. (previously known as Forjas Taurus S.A.) is a Brazilian manufacturing conglomerate based in São Leopoldo, Rio Grande do Sul, Brazil. Founded in 1924 as a tool and die forging plant, the company now consists of Taurus Armas, its firearm division, as well as other divisions focusing on metals manufacturing, plastics, body armors, helmets and civil construction.

In 2021, the U.S. accounted for 79.6% of total sales, a growth of 23.4%. In 2020, 41% of all the revolvers sold in the US were Taurus brand revolvers and, in 2021, it is estimated that this market share has reached 61%. Firearms and accessories accounted for 70.1% of total sales revenue in the U.S.

History

Taurus produced its first revolver, the Model 38101SO, in 1941.  Beginning in 1953, it exported revolvers to the U.S. market through a series of importers.

In 1962, the Bangor Punta Corporation, then the parent company of Smith & Wesson, purchased 87 percent of Forjas Taurus, allowing the two firearms manufacturers to easily share information regarding design and manufacturing. In 1973, Taurus was purchased from Bangor Punta by its current owners, and its ties to Smith & Wesson were severed.

In 1981, after Italian arms manufacturer Beretta had completed its contracts to produce firearms for Brazil's military, Taurus purchased Beretta's São Paulo manufacturing plant along with the tooling, technical drawings, and work force necessary to produce several different pistol designs.

In order to more effectively tap the U.S. market, the company created a subsidiary, Taurus International Manufacturing Incorporated, also known as Taurus USA, in 1988.

In 1995 Forjas Taurus purchased the rights & equipment to manufacture Rossi brand revolvers. They currently manufacture three .38 Special models and four .357 Magnum models under the Rossi name, manufactured in São Leopoldo, Brazil. In 2009, Heritage Manufacturing was also purchased and its production later moved to Taurus' Miami, Florida plant.

In 2019, Taurus USA moved their facilities from Miami, Florida to Bainbridge, Georgia.

Products
The current product line includes steel-frame pistols, polymer-frame pistols, revolvers, and law enforcement weapons (submachine guns and rifles), the latter intended for the domestic Brazilian market. The company manufactures and sells its firearms for generally less than other manufacturers due to low labor costs, as well as having the facilities available to build virtually every part themselves.

One writer said in 2010 that the "quality of Taurus handguns in the modern era is second to none". In 2015, Taurus settled a lawsuit for $39 million and recalled nearly one million handguns produced between 1997 and 2013 due to "safety defects".

Firearm model overview
Taurus was originally known for manufacturing revolvers similar in design to those offered by Smith & Wesson. The company moved away from this realm by offering larger framed models such as the Raging Bull (.454 Casull) and Raging Hornet (.22 Hornet) revolvers as well as the Judge 5-shot revolvers (.410 bore and .45 Colt).

One of Taurus' most successful semiautomatic handguns has been its PT92, a model similar to Beretta's model 92 line, but with the addition of an ambidextrous frame safety, rather than the Beretta's slide-mounted safety.

The most recent addition to the Taurus pistol lineup is a copy of the Colt 1911 .45 ACP pistol, the PT1911. This slightly redesigned and updated design offers many features.

Semi-automatic pistols

 Taurus Millennium series (Models 111, 140, 145, and 745)
 Taurus PT22 .22 Long Rifle
Taurus PT25 .25 ACP
 PT 24/7
 Taurus TCP 732 .32 ACP
 Taurus TCP 738 .380 ACP
 PT92 (Models 92 and 100)
 PT1911
 Taurus Model PT809, PT809c / Taurus Model 840 / Taurus Model 845
 Slim Series, 709 (9mm) and 740 (.40 S&W)
 PT-2045
 Taurus TS9
 Taurus PT911 9mm (15 or 10 round)
 Taurus PT 909, PT945
 Taurus PT 908 (9mm) (8 round)
 Taurus PT 51 6.35mm
 Taurus PT 915 9mm
 Taurus PT 917 9mm
 Taurus PT 938
 Taurus PT 940 .40 caliber
 Taurus PT 838
 Taurus PT 838c
 Taurus Curve
 Taurus Spectrum
 Taurus G2C G2S G3
 Taurus TX22 (22lr 16 round)
 Taurus GX4

Revolvers

Small frame 
 Taurus Model 327 6 shot .327 Federal Magnum
Taurus Model 431 .44 Special
 Taurus Model 405 .40 S&W
 Taurus Model 445 .44 Special
 Taurus Model 605 .357 Magnum
 Taurus Model 606 .357 Magnum
 Taurus CIA (Models 650 and 850) – Carry It Anywhere. A concealed hammer revolver based on the Smith & Wesson Centennial
 Taurus Protector (Models 651 and 851) – Shrouded hammer based on the Smith & Wesson Bodyguard
 Taurus Model 85 (includes Model 856) .38 Special
 Taurus Model 731 .32 H&R Magnum
 Taurus Model 73 .32 S&W Long
Taurus Model 905 9mm Parabellum
 Taurus Model 94 .22 Long Rifle
Taurus Model 941 .22 WMR

Compact frame 

 Taurus Model 617 .357 Magnum 7 shot revolver
Taurus Model 817 .38 Special 7 shot revolver

Medium frame 

 Taurus Model 82 .38 Special
 Taurus Model 80 .38
 Taurus Model 65 / Taurus Model 66 .357 Magnum
Taurus Model 689 .357 Magnum

Large frame 
 Taurus Model 607 7-shot.357 Magnum
 Taurus Model 608 8-shot .357 Magnum
 Taurus Model 689 6-shot .357 Magnum
 Taurus Model 692 7-shot .357 Magnum/9mm/38SPL
 Taurus Model 44 6-shot .44 Magnum

Families 
 Taurus Judge (Model 4510)
 Taurus Raging Bull
 Taurus Tracker (Models 17, 425, 44, 627, 970, 990, 991, and 992)

Rossi models 
 Rossi Model 971 .357 Magnum
 Rossi R46102 .357 Magnum
 Rossi R35102 .38 Special
 Rossi R85104 .38 Special
 Rossi R46202 .357 Magnum
 Rossi R35202 .38 Special
 Rossi R97206 .357 Magnum
 Rossi Circuit Judge .410ga/45lc (carbine)

Submachine guns
 Taurus SMT submachine gun

Rifles
 Taurus ART556 rifle
 Taurus CT G2 carbine
 Taurus T4
Taurus T4SA AR-15 semi-automatic rifle

Shotguns
 Taurus ST12

Grenade launchers

 Taurus LT38SA

Recall and settlement 
Nine of their more popular models manufactured between 1997 and 2013 have been issued a voluntary recall in 2015. This is around one million pistols and includes the following models.

 PT-111 Millennium
 PT-132 Millennium
 PT-138-Millennium
 PT-140 Millennium
 PT-145 Millennium
 PT-745 Millennium
 PT-609
 PT-640
 PT-24/7

A class action settlement has also been agreed to which amounts to almost 39 million dollars due to the defective models.

See also
 IMBEL – another Brazilian firearms manufacturer.

References

External links
 Taurus USA 
 Taurus France 
 Taurus Export 
 Taurus Forum
 Carryconcealed.net review of the Taurus 605B2 

Companhia Brasileira de Cartuchos
Firearm manufacturers of Brazil
Defence companies of Brazil
Companies based in São Leopoldo
Manufacturing companies established in 1939
1939 establishments in Brazil
Companies listed on B3 (stock exchange)
Brazilian brands